is a village located in Kuma District, Kumamoto Prefecture, Japan.

As of March 2017, the village has an estimated population of 2,276 and a population density of 12 persons per km². The total area is 192.11 km².

References

External links

Mizukami official website 

Villages in Kumamoto Prefecture